31 Canadian Brigade Group (31 CBG) is part of the 4th Canadian Division, under the Canadian Army. It encompasses the southwestern portion of Ontario, and is headquartered in London, Ontario. The 31 CBG area of responsibility stretches from Hamilton to Windsor. The brigade has approximately 2,400 soldiers. Colonel Chris Brown, CD is Commander of 31 Canadian Brigade Group. The brigade sergeant-major is Chief Warrant Officer Mike Coit, CD.

History

Second World War
31st (Reserve) Brigade Group was created, within 1 Militia District, on 1 April 1942 when the reserve force in Canada was reorganized for the war.  Like today, the formation consisted of part-time soldiers who were paraded and trained on evenings and weekends.  The brigade group was closed down on 28 November 1945 and the headquarters itself closed on 8 June 1946.  During its existence, the brigade group was headquartered in London, Ontario and it held the following organization:

Canadian Infantry Corps
1st (Reserve) Battalion, The Middlesex and Huron Regiment
2nd (Reserve) Battalion, The Canadian Fusiliers (City of London Regiment) MG
2nd (Reserve) Battalion, The Essex Scottish Regiment
2nd (Reserve) Battalion, The Scots Fusiliers of Canada
Canadian Armoured Corps
30th (Reserve) Reconnaissance Regiment (Essex Regiment (Tank))
Royal Canadian Artillery
31st (Reserve) Field Regiment, RCA
Royal Canadian Engineers
7th/11th (Reserve) Field Company, RCE
Royal Canadian Army Service Corps
Brigade Group Company, 1st (Reserve) Divisional, RCASC
Royal Canadian Army Medical Corps
24th (Reserve) Field Ambulance, RCAMC
Royal Canadian Corps of Signals
E and J sections, No.1 (Reserve) District Signals, RCCS
Royal Canadian Ordnance Corps / Royal Canadian Electrical and Mechanical Engineers
No.2 Group,
No.2 (Reserve) Divisional Workshop, (RCOC) RCEME
No.1 (Reserve) Light Aid Detachment (Type A), (RCOC) RCEME
No.2 (Reserve) Light Aid Detachment (Type B), (RCOC) RCEME
No.3 (Reserve) Light Aid Detachment (Type B), (RCOC) RCEME
No.4 (Reserve) Light Aid Detachment (Type B), (RCOC) RCEME

1997 to Present
31 Canadian Brigade Group (CBG) was recreated on 1 April 1997, with its headquarters located in London, replacing the London Militia District (LMD). Resulting from a major restructuring of the army, it was established as one of ten reserve brigade groups organized across Canada.

Brigade composition

Overview 
31 CBG is an infantry-focused reserve brigade comprising 12 units in addition to the brigade headquarters in London. These units are spread out over southern and south-western Ontario, in London, Sarnia, Windsor, Guelph, Hamilton, St. Thomas, Waterloo, Burlington, Stratford, Owen Sound, Barrie, Cambridge, Kitchener, and Chatham. The Grey and Simcoe Foresters also provide support to the 4th Canadian Division as part of the Arctic Response Company Group, supporting communities in northern Ontario and northern Canada.

Regiments

See also 

 List of armouries in Canada
 Military history of Canada
 History of the Canadian Army
 Canadian Armed Forces

References

Brigades of the Canadian Army
Organizations based in London, Ontario
Companies based in London, Ontario
Canadian World War II brigades